
Gmina Choczewo is a rural gmina (administrative district) in Wejherowo County, Pomeranian Voivodeship, in northern Poland.

Villages
Gmina Choczewo contains the villages and settlements of Biebrowo, Borkowo Lęborskie, Borkowo Małe, Brachówko, Cegielnia, Choczewko, Choczewo, Ciekocinko, Ciekocino, Gardkowice, Gościęcino, Jabłonowice, Jackowo, Karczemka Gardkowska, Karczemka Kierzkowska, Kierzkowo, Kierzkowo Małe, Kopalino, Krzesiniec, Kurowo, Łętówko, Łętowo, Lubiatowo, Lublewko, Lublewo Lęborskie, Osetnik, Osieki Lęborskie, Przebędówko, Przebędowo, Sasinko, Sasino, Sasino-Kolonia, Słajkowo, Słajszewko, Słajszewo, Starbienino, Szklana Huta, Żelazna, Zwarcienko, Zwartówko and Zwartowo.

Neighbouring gminas
Gmina Choczewo is bordered by the town of Łeba and by the gminas of Gniewino, Krokowa, Łęczyce, Nowa Wieś Lęborska and Wicko.

References
Polish official population figures 2006

Choczewo
Wejherowo County